Noorie is a 1979 Indian romance film produced by Yash Chopra, and directed by Manmohan Krishna; this is his only film as director. The film stars Farooq Shaikh, Poonam Dhillon, Madan Puri and Iftekhar. The film's music is by Khayyam and the lyrics by Jan Nisar Akhtar.

The film was a "Super-Hit" and the seventh highest-grossing film at the Indian box office in 1979. It was also an overseas hit in China, where it released in 1981, and became one of the most successful Indian films in China at the time, along with Awaara and Caravan.

Plot 
Noorie (Poonam Dhillon) lives in the Bhaderwah valleys with her father, Ghulam Nabi (Iftekhar) and her dog Khairoo. She has a boyfriend Yusuf (Farooq Shaikh), they decide to get married, the date is decided and preparations begin. But fate had something else in store. Another villager, Bashir Khan (Bharat Kapoor) takes a liking to Noorie and approaches Noorie's father for her hand, to which Ghulam Nabi refuses. An angry Bashir Khan then arranges the murder of Gulam Nabi, through his men, using a falling tree. The marriage is suspended, and few months later when the marriage preparations are back on, a few days before the marriage, Bashir Khan, who happens to be Yusuf's boss, sends him on an errand out of town. While Yusuf is out of town, Bashir Khan goes over to Noorie's house and rapes her. Noorie commits suicide and Yusuf gets to know that it all happened because of Bashir. So, followed by Khairoo, he runs behind Bashir to kill him. They end up in a physical fight and Yusuf gets shot by Bashir. As Bashir runs back, he finds Khairoo there, who finally kills Bashir. Yusuf runs to the place where Noorie's body is and dies there. At the end they both are dug into the ground and unite with each other.

Cast 

 Farooque Shaikh as Yusuf Fakir Mohammed
 Poonam Dhillon as Noorie Nabi
 Madan Puri as Lala Karamchand
 Iftekhar as Ghulam Nabi
 Padma Khanna  as Courtesan
 Gita Siddharth as Karamchand's daughter-in-law
 Javed Khan as Faulad Khan
 Bharat Kapoor as Basheer Khan
 Avtar Gill as Basheer's friend
 Manmohan Krishna as Saiji (Storyteller)

Soundtrack 
The following tracks were composed by Khayyam, with lyrics by Jan Nisar Akhtar, Naqsh Lyallpuri and Majrooh Sultanpuri.

Awards 

 27th Filmfare Awards:

Nominated

 Best Film – Yash Chopra
 Best Director – Manmohan Krishna
 Best Actress – Poonam Dhillon
 Best Music Director – Khayyam
 Best Lyricist – Jan Nisar Akhtar for "Aaja Re"
 Best Male Playback Singer – Nitin Mukesh for "Aaja Re"

Trivia 
Teri Meherbaniyan (1985) was copy of this film, starring also Poonam Dhillon and with a wonder dog too.

References

External links 
 
 Noorie (1979) at Yash Raj Films

1979 films
1970s Hindi-language films
Films scored by Khayyam
Films set in Jammu and Kashmir
1970s Urdu-language films
Yash Raj Films films
1970s romance films
Indian romance films
1970s multilingual films
Indian multilingual films